Tarsus station ( is a railway station in the city of Tarsus. Tarsus is a city in Mersin Province, Turkey. (population 238276 as of 2010)

The station 
It became a part of the Berlin-Baghdad Railway in 1911. This increased the traffic of the station. After the Republic of Turkey was proclaimed in 1923, Turkish government began the railway nationalization project. According to act no.1376 (Jan. 5, 1929) Adana-Mersin railway was also absorbed by the Chemins de Fer Ottomans d'Anatolie (Turkish: Osmanlı Anadolu Demiryolları), a subsidiary of the Turkish State Railways (TCDD). Presently the number of intermediate stations is 9.

The station building 
The original station building no longer exists. The present station building was built in 1949. The building is symmetrical. The tollbooths are in the central section.

Services 
The majority of trains using Tarsus station are freight trains. The main passenger service is between Mersin and Adana, 23 times daily, all of which stop at Tarsus. Some of these trains connect with main line trains at Yenice, the next station east of Tarsus.

References

Buildings and structures in Mersin Province
Railway stations in Mersin Province
Tarsus, Mersin
Transport in Mersin Province
Railway stations opened in 1886